Goran "Gale" Šepa (Serbian Cyrillic: Горан Шепа, born 10 September 1958) is a Serbian rock singer. He is best known as the lead singer for the Serbian and former Yugoslav hard rock band Kerber. Šepa is known for his melodic vocal style.

Discography

with Kerber

Studio albums
Nebo je malo za sve (1983)
Ratne igre (1984)
Seobe (1986)
Ljudi i bogovi (1988)
Peta strana sveta (1990)
Zapis (1996)

Live albums
121288 (1989)
Unplugged (1998)

Compilations
Antologija 1982 - 1998 I (1998)
Antologija 1982 - 1998 II (1998)

Singles
Sveti Nikola (2009)

Box sets
Sabrana dela (2009)

References 
EX YU ROCK enciklopedija 1960–2006, Janjatović Petar; 

1958 births
Living people
Musicians from Niš
Serbian rock singers
20th-century Serbian male singers
Yugoslav male singers
Yugoslav rock singers
Serbian heavy metal musicians